is a subway station in Bunkyō, Tokyo, Japan, operated by Tokyo Metro. Its station number is M-24. The station opened on 20 January 1954, and consists of two side platforms.

Lines
Shin-ōtsuka Station is served by the Tokyo Metro Marunouchi Line.

Station Layout
The station consists of two underground side platforms, with separate ticket gates for the corresponding platforms. In 2011, a connecting passage was completed to connect the two ticket gates together and the gates for platform 1 was renamed as the North gate and that for platform 2 as the South gate.

Platforms

Surroundings
Ōtsuka Station
Mukōhara Station
Asahi Shinkin Bank
Toho Junior College of Music

History 
Shin-otsuka Station opened for revenue service on 20 January 1954.

The station facilities were inherited by Tokyo Metro after the privatization of the Teito Rapid Transit Authority (TRTA) in 2004.

References

External links

This article incorporates information from the corresponding article on the Japanese Wikipedia.

Railway stations in Japan opened in 1954
Stations of Tokyo Metro
Tokyo Metro Marunouchi Line
Railway stations in Tokyo